Kim Hae-ran (Hangul: 김해란, Hanja: 金海蘭; born 16 March 1984) is a South Korean professional volleyball player. She was part of the team at the 2012 Summer Olympics and 2016 Summer Olympics. She also competed at the 2006 World Championship and 2018 Nations League.

Hae-ran played a key role in the team, as one of the best diggers, being the best libero in the 2019 FIVB World Cup with a 3.95 average per set.

In 2020, at the end of the 2019−20 season, she announced her retirement from the courts. She wanted to give a chance to younger players, and also start a family.

Clubs
 Korea Expressway Corporation (2002–2015)
 Daejeon KGC (2015–2017)
 Incheon Heungkuk Life Pink Spiders (2017–2020, 2021–)

References

External links
 

1984 births
Living people
South Korean women's volleyball players
Volleyball players at the 2012 Summer Olympics
Olympic volleyball players of South Korea
Asian Games medalists in volleyball
Volleyball players at the 2006 Asian Games
Volleyball players at the 2014 Asian Games
Volleyball players at the 2016 Summer Olympics
Medalists at the 2014 Asian Games
Asian Games gold medalists for South Korea
Sportspeople from Ulsan
21st-century South Korean women